Eritrea–Israel relations are foreign relations between Eritrea and Israel. Both countries established diplomatic relation in 1993 following Eritrean independence. Eritrea has an embassy in Ramat Gan and Israel has an embassy in Asmara. Israeli-Eritrean ties are complicated by Israel's close ties to Ethiopia, who have shared an unfriendly dyad with Eritrea for a long time. Nevertheless, their ties are generally considered as very close.

Eritrean War of Independence

During the end of the Eritrean War of Independence, Israel provided support to Ethiopia. This was because it saw the Eritrean conflict as an extension of the wider Arab–Israeli conflict. The majority of Arab countries supported Eritrea's separation from Ethiopia. They saw its sizeable Muslim population (45%) as a way to make sure the Red Sea remained "Arab Waters". For this reason Israel allied itself with the Ethiopian government to take advantage of the long Eritrean coast which stretches over 1,080 kilometres. This began in the early 1960s when Israel started helping the Ethiopian government in its campaigns against the Eritrean Liberation Front (ELF). The Ethiopian government portrayed the Eritrean rebellion as an Arab threat to the African region, an argument that convinced the Israelis to side with the Ethiopian government in the conflict. Israel trained counter-insurgency forces in order to counter the armed struggle of the ELF.

Israel considered the Eritrean liberation struggle as supported by Arab states and feared that a pro-Arab independent Eritrea would block Israeli passage through the Red Sea. As the war developed, Israeli assistance to the Ethiopian government was increased. By 1966, there were around 100 Israeli military advisors in Ethiopia. By 1967, troops trained by Israeli advisors had taken control over much of Eritrea. By the late 1970s, the Eritrean People's Liberation Front (EPLF) had become the main rebel group in Eritrea after defeating the ELF. After another decade of war, in May 1991 the Ethiopian government was overthrown by the EPLF rebel group (Eritrea) and replaced by a Pro-Eritrea Government in that time (TPLF). EPLF rebel group established Eritrea's independence and made Ethiopia a landlocked country.

Post-independence
A strategic relationship between the new government of Eritrea and Israel was formed when Eritrea's President Isaias Afwerki travelled to Israel for medical treatment in 1993. Afwerki was transferred to Israel by an American airplane. The US representative in the Eritrean capital Asmara suggested the idea after the Eritrean leader fell ill. This happening along with American efforts led to the opening of an Israeli Embassy in Asmara on March 15, 1993, prior to the official announcement on April 27, 1993. There are allegations by Arab states of military and intelligence ties including claims that Israel aided Eritrea during the Hanish Islands conflict against Yemen (a country which does not recognize Israel), however there is no clear evidence. Additionally, the Eritrean government does not recognize Palestine.

See also
 History of the Jews in Eritrea

References

Israel
Bilateral relations of Israel